Urban Waste (active 1981-Present Day) is a New York hardcore punk band from Ravenswood Queens that was part of the New York renaissance of hardcore punk in the early 1980s. Much more raw, visceral, and overtly confrontational than their New York punk predecessors, they were contemporaries of Reagan Youth (of which bass player Andy Apathy was an early member), the earliest incarnation of the Beastie Boys, and Bad Brains. They belonged to a group of bands coming out of the borough of Queens that included Kraut, Gilligan's Revenge (later called Token Entry), Murphy's Law, and The Mob. The band, like many others of the era, was short-lived, and after the breakup several members went on to form Major Conflict.

Recordings
Their only recorded material was an eight-song 7", which was released in 1982 on Mob Style Records, the record label of fellow hardcore band The Mob (and later as a 12" on Big City Records). The Urban Waste EP has been released by the New York City label Mad at the World Records in its series of New York hardcore reissues from the early 1980s.[2] The EP was also reissued in digital format by the New York-based digital label Anthology Recordings.

Roger Miret, lead vocalist for New York hardcore legends Agnostic Front, reportedly cited Urban Waste as the band that got him into hardcore, and has mentioned the group as being one of his favorites of the early NYHC scene.

Tours
In 2002 Urban Waste played CBGB's for a 20-year reunion, and record release party for "reissue" of the 82' E.P. This short lived fun experience ended a few months later.

The band re-grouped again in 2008 Playing infrequent shows, and released "Recycled" in late 2010. This was a compilation of unreleased songs and a few new songs written in this time period.

2012 was the strongest year for the band to date, as far as playing out, and writing new material. 
This is also the first time in the band's career that they have gone overseas, playing 
Europe in Venlo, The Netherlands on September 22, 2012.

Discography
 Urban Waste 7" ep (Mob Style Records, 1982)
 Urban Waste 12"ep reissue (Big City Records)
 Urban Waste CD ep bootleg (Lost and Found Records)
 Urban Waste 12" ep reissue (Mad at the World Records, 2003)
 Urban Waste CD ep reissue (Hungry Eye/ Mad at the World Records, 2003) 
 Urban Waste Recycled LP (Rebel Sound Records 2010)
 URBAN WASTE Recycled CD (Nicotine Records - Euro Release 2011)
 Urban Waste 82' E.P. 7" Vinyl (Way back when Records and Even Worse Records 2012)
 Urban Waste 2014 7" Split with The Nasty,Notox,Red Tape
 Urban Waste Waste x Crew ep 2015
 Urban Waste More Wasted Years cd 2021
 Urban Waste More Wasted Years Vinyl 2022
 Urban Waste What Else Is New? Vinyl 2023

Members
Josh Waste - vocals 2010–Present
Johnny Waste - guitar 1981–Present
Vinny Carriero  - bass 2020-Present
Stooley Kutchakokov - drums 2015–Present

Past members
Vocals
Billy Phillips (Major Conflict) 1981 - 1982
Kenny "Waste" Ahrens 1982 - 2011
Zac Stough 2002 and 2011,Early 2012

Bass
Freddie Watt 1981 - 1982
Andy Apathy (Reagan Youth) 1982 - 1984
A.J. Ricci 2002,2011- Early 2013
Phil Kinkel 2008-2009
Sammy Ahmed 2009
Paul Bakija (Reagan Youth) 2009
Sonny Baron 2009 - 2011
A.J. Ricci 2012-2013
Nonlee Saito- 2012-2020
Drums
 John Dancy 1981 - 2010
 Jimmy Duke (SQNS,Ultra Violence,Iconicide) 2010 - 2014

References

External links
http://www.urbanwaste.net

Hardcore punk groups from New York (state)